The village of Lakshmigari Palli is one of the biggest villages in the state of Andhra Pradesh.

Villages in Kadapa district